The Nebraska Legislature (also called the Unicameral) is the legislature of the U.S. state of Nebraska. The Legislature meets at the Nebraska State Capitol in Lincoln. With 49 members, known as "senators", the Nebraska Legislature is the smallest state legislature of any U.S. state.

Unlike the legislatures of the other 49 U.S. states and the U.S. Congress, the Nebraska Legislature is a unicameral legislature, thus not separated into two houses. It is also nonpartisan, and does not officially recognize its members' political party affiliations.

History

The First Nebraska Territorial Legislature met in Omaha in 1855, staying there until statehood was granted in 1867. Nebraska originally operated under a bicameral legislature, but over time dissatisfaction with the bicameral system grew. Bills were lost because the two houses could not agree on a single version. Conference committees that formed to merge the two bills coming out of each chamber often met in secret, and thus were unaccountable for their actions. Campaigns to consolidate the Nebraska Legislature into a single chamber date back as early as 1913, meeting with mixed success.

After a trip to Australia in 1931, George W. Norris, then U.S. senator for Nebraska, campaigned for reform, arguing that the bicameral system was based on the non-democratic British House of Lords, and that it was pointless to have two bodies of people doing the same thing and hence wasting money. He specifically pointed to the example of the Australian state of Queensland, which had adopted a unicameral parliament nearly ten years before. In 1934, voters approved a constitutional amendment to take effect with the 1936 elections, abolishing the Nebraska House of Representatives and granting its powers to the Senate.

Many possible reasons for the 1934 amendment's victory have been advanced: the popularity of George Norris; the Depression-era desire to cut costs; public dissatisfaction with the previous year's legislature; or even the fact that, by chance, it was on the ballot in the same year as an amendment to legalize parimutuel betting on horse races. This final coincidence may have aided the measure's passage in Omaha, where the unicameral issue was not a pressing one but horse racing was. (Gambling interests campaigned for "yes" votes on all amendments in hopes of assuring the horse-racing amendment's passage.)

The new unicameral Legislature met for the first time in 1937. Though the name of the body is formally the "Nebraska Legislature", during the first session the Legislature adopted a resolution formally giving members the title of "senator". In Nebraska, the Legislature is also often known as "the Unicameral."

General powers

The Legislature is responsible for law-making and appropriating funds for the state. The governor has the power to veto any bill, but the Legislature may override the governor's veto by a vote of three-fifths (30) of its members. The Legislature also has the power, by a three-fifths vote, to propose a constitutional amendment to the voters, who then pass or reject it through a referendum.

Selection, composition and operation
The Legislature is composed of 49 members, chosen by a single-member district or constituency. Senators are chosen for four-year terms, with one-half of the seats up for election every second year. In effect, this results in half the chamber being elected at the same time as the President of the United States, and the other half elected at the same time as other statewide elections. Senators must be qualified voters who are at least 21 years old and have lived in the district they wish to represent for at least one year. A constitutional amendment passed in 2000 limits senators to two consecutive terms. However, a former senator is re-eligible for election after four years. Senators receive $12,000 a year.

Rather than separate primary elections held to choose Republican, Democratic, and other partisan contenders for a seat, Nebraska uses a single nonpartisan blanket primary, in which the top two vote-getters are entitled to run in the general election. There are no formal party alignments or groups within the Legislature. Coalitions tend to form issue by issue based on a member's philosophy of government, geographic background, and constituency. However, almost all the members of the legislature are known to be either Democrats or Republicans, and the state branches of both parties explicitly endorse candidates for legislative seats.

Vacancies 
Vacancies in the Legislature are appointed by the governor.

Length of session 
Sessions of the Nebraska Legislature last for 90 working days in odd-numbered years and 60 working days in even-numbered years.

Special Sessions 
Article IV-8 of the Nebraska State Constitution gives the Governor the power to call special sessions on "extraordinary occasions." When called, lawmakers may only consider legislation outlined in the Governor's proclamation.

Membership

The Nebraska Legislature officially recognizes no party affiliations; affiliations listed are based on state party endorsements. , 32 members are Republicans and 17 are Democrats.

Leadership

Lieutenant Governor
The Lieutenant Governor is the President of the Legislature and the official presiding officer. When presiding, the Lieutenant Governor may vote to break a tie in the Legislature, but may not break a tie when the vote is on the final passage of a bill.

Speaker
The highest position among the members is the Speaker, who presides over the Legislature in the absence of the Lieutenant Governor. The current Speaker of the Nebraska Legislature is John Arch. The Speaker is elected by floor ballot (or secret ballot) for a two-year term. The Speaker, with the approval of the executive board, determines the agenda (or the order in which bills and resolutions  are  considered on General  File). The Speaker's agenda may be changed by a three-fifths vote of the elected members of the Legislature. The Speaker is not a member of any committee, but is an ex-officio member of the Rules Committee and the executive board.

Executive Board
Administrative matters of the body are dealt with by the executive board. The Board includes the Speaker, a chairman, a vice chairman, and six other senators. The chairman and vice chairman are chosen by floor ballot (or secret ballot) for two-year terms by the entire legislature. The chairman of the Appropriations Committee serves, but cannot vote on any matter, and can only speak on fiscal matters.

The executive board is also the Referencing Committee. All bills introduced are referenced by the Referencing Committee to the committee whose subject relates to the bill. Any member of the Legislature may object to where a bill was referenced and attempt re-refer the bill to a different committee with a majority vote of the Legislature.

Caucuses
The Nebraska Legislature does not caucus based on political affiliation or use caucuses to organize support or opposition to legislation. Senators are classified into three geographically based caucuses based on the three congressional districts in the state. Each caucus elects two board members who serve on the executive board and four members who serve on the Committee-on-Committees.

Committees in the Legislature

Committee selection and election of chairs
At the beginning of each biennium, the Legislature elects a Committee on Committees of thirteen members, one at large who is elected by all members from the floor of the Legislature by floor ballot (or secret ballot).  Four members are from Districts 2, 3, 15, 16, 19, 21–29, 45, and 46; four from Districts 4–14, 18, 20, 31, 39, and 49; and four from Districts 1, 17, 30, 32–38, 40–44, 47, and 48. Each caucus elects its own four members to serve on the Committee on Committees. The Committee on Committees creates a report of the membership of all committees for the Legislature. The Legislature may approve the report with a majority vote or reject it, but may not amend the report. If the report is rejected, the Committee on Committees must start over and create a new committee membership report until the Legislature can adopt one.

Committee chairs are elected on the first day of the 90-day session and serve until the end of the 60-day session. Committee chairs are elected directly by the entire membership of the Legislature. On the first day, those wishing to run for a committee chair give a brief speech as to why they believe they're qualified, and following the speeches for that committee, members use a ballot vote to choose who they wish to serve as committee chair.

History of committee chair elections
The first Unicameral allowed each committee to select its own committee chair in 1937; from 1939 to 1971 the Committee on Committees designated the committee chair; and from 1973 to present committee chairs are chosen by ballot. The Speaker, Committee on Committees chair, and the chair and vice chair of the executive board have been chosen by floor ballot since the Unicameral's first day in 1937.

See also
History of Nebraska

References

External links
 
 History of the Nebraska Unicameral
 Unicameral Update official news of the Nebraska Legislature since 1977

 
Legislature
Nebraska
Defunct bicameral legislatures
1867 establishments in Nebraska